Vrena (local pronunciation Vréna) is a locality situated in Nyköping Municipality, Södermanland County, Sweden with 630 inhabitants as of 2015.

Geography 
Vrena is located between the lakes of Hallbosjön and Långhalsen along national road 52. The larger lake of Yngaren is also close. The area is surrounded by lakes in multiple directions and is situated on a narrow branch of elevated land that separates the various Sörmlandic lake basins. Vrena is also nearly halfway between the settlements of Stigtomta and Bettna, the latter on the other side of the nearby boundary of Flen Municipality.

The local climate is mild for its latitude. Lake moderation vanishes in winter since those frequently freeze over. During summer the surrounding waters lower diurnal temperature variation, rendering milder days and warmer nights than would be expected for a location in the Sörmlandic interior. The nearest weather stations at similar low elevation are in the inland Flodafors and the seaside Oxelösund, with Vrena's lakeside climate a mixture of the two.

Elections 
Vrena has an electoral ward in Nyköping Municipality, covering the village and the surrounding areas around Yngaren. Although the locality's industrial roots rendered it left-wing in the past, in the early 21st century the pattern flipped as Vrena became more of a residential commuter village, thus switching to the right.

Riksdag

References 

Populated places in Södermanland County
Populated places in Nyköping Municipality